Investigator Strait is a body of water  in South Australia lying between the Yorke Peninsula, on the Australian mainland, and Kangaroo Island. It was named by Matthew Flinders after his ship, HMS Investigator, on his voyage of 1801–1802. It is bordered by the Gulf St Vincent in the northeast.

Discovery and exploration
It was named Investigator’s Strait by Flinders on Monday 29 March 1802.

Extent
Investigator Strait is bounded by Yorke Peninsula to its north and by Kangaroo Island to its south.  Flinders identified its boundaries with the following adjoining bodies of water - Gulf St Vincent and Backstairs Passage.  The Strait’s boundary with Gulf St Vincent is the line from Troubridge Point on Yorke Peninsula to Cape Jervis on Fleurieu Peninsula.  Its boundary with Backstairs Passage is the line from Cape Jervis on Fleurieu Peninsula to Kangaroo Head (west of Penneshaw) on Kangaroo Island.  Flinders noted that Backstairs Passage is a body of water separate to Investigator Strait.  The boundary between the strait and Nepean Bay on the north-east coast of Kangaroo Island is a line between Point Marsden and  Kangaroo Head.   The Strait’s western boundary by definition is the line from Cape Spencer on Yorke Peninsula to Cape Borda on Kangaroo Island.

Protected areas
A number of protected areas are located both within and adjoining the Strait’s extent.

Aquatic reserves
Troubridge Hill west of Troubridge Point on the south coast of Yorke Peninsula.

Marine parks
Southern Spencer Gulf Marine Park - the west end of the strait including the coasts of both Yorke Peninsula and Kangaroo Island.
Lower Yorke Peninsula Marine Park - east end of the strait adjoining the south coast of Yorke Peninsula.
Western Kangaroo Island Marine Park - west end of the strait adjoining the north coast of Kangaroo Island.
Encounter Marine Park covers the east end of the strait including its boundaries with Nepean Bay and Backstairs Passage.

National parks and other reserves
The following reserves are located on the south coast of Yorke Peninsula (from west to east):
Innes National Park (includes Chinamans Hat Island)  
Point Davenport Conservation Park
The following reserves are located on the north coast of Kangaroo Island (from west to east):
Flinders Chase National Park
Cape Torrens Wilderness Protection Area
Western River Wilderness Protection Area
The following reserve is located on Althorpe Islands, Haystack Island and Seal Island at the north-west end of the strait:
Althorpe Islands Conservation Park

References

Further reading
 Arnott, T., (1996), Investigator Strait Maritime Heritage Trail, Heritage Branch, Department for Environment, Heritage and Aboriginal Affairs. Adelaide.
 Coroneos, Cosmos & McKinnon, Robert; (1997), Shipwrecks of the Investigator Strait and the Lower Yorke Peninsula, Department of Environment and Natural Resources, Adelaide, South Australia..
 McKinnon, R.; (1993), Shipwreck sites of Kangaroo Island, State Heritage Branch, Department of Environment and Land Management. Adelaide.

 
Straits of Australia
Kangaroo Island
Yorke Peninsula